The Goliad Declaration of Independence was signed on December 20, 1835 at Presidio La Bahía in Mexican Texas.

History
The declaration was signed by 91 Texan colonists and Tejanos in the Gulf Coast of Mexico settlements which supported breaking away from Mexico and creating an independent state. 

While the document drafted by Matagorda alcalde (mayor) Ira Ingram was a precursor to the Texas Declaration of Independence, it was deemed premature when received by the Consultation in San Felipe de Austin.  

There was not yet a clear consensus among Texians for either declaring outright independence or remaining part of Mexico with the restoration of the 1824 Mexican Constitution. It was effectively quashed by sending it to the Committee on State and Judiciary, and was later just filed away.

See also
Coahuila y Tejas — Mexican state in region, 1824-1836.
 — 1821-1836.

References

External links

Mexican Texas
.
1835 in Mexico
1835 in Texas
1835 in politics
Goliad County, Texas
December 1835 events
1835 documents